Christianspris or Frederiksort was a Danish fortification somewhat north of the then Danish city of Kiel. In 1632 the Danish king Christian IV initiated the works of making a fortification on a land tongue on the West shore of the Kielerfiord on the Jernved peninsula. The purpose was to secure this land against German troops during the 30-years War. However, the town was short lived. Christian IV founded many towns and cities. It is thought this town only survived around 10 years. 

Forts in Denmark
Kiel
1632 establishments in Denmark
Buildings and structures completed in 1632
Coastal fortifications